The 1993 Maine Black Bears football team was an American football team that represented the University of Maine as a member of the Yankee Conference during the 1993 NCAA Division I-AA football season. In their first season under head coach Jack Cosgrove, the Black Bears compiled a 3–8 record (2–6 against conference opponents) and finished last in the New England Division of the Yankee Conference. 

The team's three victories were later forfeited for the use of ineligible players. The school's athletic director resigned following the controversy.

Schedule

References

Maine
Maine Black Bears football seasons
Maine Black Bears football